The BSA Golden Flash, commonly referred to as the Gold Flash, was a  air-cooled parallel twin motorcycle designed by Bert Hopwood and produced by Birmingham Small Arms Company (BSA) at Small Heath, Birmingham. The Golden Flash was the first model in the BSA A10 series. It was available in black and chrome; but it was the distinctive golden paint scheme that gave The Golden Flash its name. Production continued until 1963, when it was superseded by the BSA A65 Star.

Development

Background and development
Bert Hopwood served an apprenticeship under designer Val Page at Ariel. In 1936, Hopwood moved to Triumph, where he worked under Edward Turner to develop the 1937 Triumph Speed Twin. The innovative Speed Twin became the exemplar of the parallel twin engine layout for British motorcycles in the 1950s and 1960s. In April 1947 Hopwood joined Norton to design the Norton Dominator engine.

BSA, then the largest UK motorcycle manufacturer, was falling behind in the parallel-twin race. Although BSA had a parallel-twin, the BSA A7, they needed to develop the bike to remain competitive. In May 1948, the factory enticed Hopwood after only a year at Norton, and he was commissioned to create a competitive BSA parallel-twin. Launched in October 1949, Hopwood's A10 Golden Flash drew heavily from the A7 design by Page and Bert Perkins.

A semi-unit gearbox meant the primary chain was adjustable via a slipper tensioner within the primary chain case. The frame was available in rear rigid format, but the more common option was plunger suspension, adopted for the export market. The A10 featured a hinged rear mudguard to ease rear wheel removal. The A10 was so closely based on the A7 that it used many of its well-proven components, and this large carry-over of parts from the A7 promised greater reliability, with minimal risk of new technical problems.

Production
The BSA Golden Flash was launched in a new gold colour, and 80% of production was destined for the United States. This resulted in long delivery times for British customers, who were offered the model only in black.

Its gold colour proved a marketing success, outselling Triumph's Speed Twin and 6T Thunderbird.

BSA were concerned that wear in the plunger suspension was leading to uncertain handling. In 1954 the factory adopted a swinging arm, and the hinged mudguard was deleted. In a seemingly backwards step, the semi-unit gearbox was abandoned for a separate "pre-unit" item. The new design had a different primary chain adjustment, a modified clutch, and new gearbox internals.

A tuned version. the Super Flash was available in the US in 1963 - 1964. Following requests for a more powerful version from the US, the engine was turned with parts from the competition department. This was an interim measure whilst sports bike version of the A10, the Road Rocket was being developed.

In 1957 an improved clutch was introduced , using 4 springs instead of six and improved friction material.

For better reliability, the Golden Flash was upgraded in 1958 to the "thick flange" cylinders (base flange increased from 3/8" to 1/2") and larger big ends originally fitted to the Road Rocket.

For 1960 the model was fitted with the 356 sports camshaft and a larger (1 1/8" bore) 389 Monobloc carburettor. It was renamed the "Royal Tourist" in the US.

An alternator was offered as an alternative to the dynamo from 1961 to 1963, the last three years of production.

In the late 1950s, motorcycle electrical component manufacturer Lucas decided to switch production from magneto/dynamo systems to alternators/coil systems. This forced British motorcycle manufacturers to completely redesign their engines. With the launch of the new unit construction (combined engine/gearbox) BSA A50 and BSA A65, the A7 and A10 were discontinued in 1963.

 In the popular British television series Heartbeat a BSA Golden Flash is featured as the police motorcycle, having replaced a Francis Barnett Falcon F150.

See also
List of motorcycles of the 1950s

References

Further reading

External links

1953 BSA A10 article 
BSA Golden Flash road test

Golden
Motorcycles introduced in 1950
Motorcycles powered by straight-twin engines